Alamgir is a village located in Kapurthala district, Punjab.

Demography 
As per Population Census 2011, the Alamgir village has population of 4952 of which 2583 are males while 2369 are females. The village is administrated by Sarpanch an elected representative of the village.  The population of children under the age of 6 years is 469 which is 9.47% of total population of Alamgir, and child sex ratio is approximately 818 lower than state average of 846.

Population data

Villages in Kapurthala

External links
  Villages in Kapurthala
 Kapurthala Villages List

References

Villages in Kapurthala district